Santa Caterina is a Roman Catholic oratory in the town limits of Borgomanero, province of Novara, Piedmont, Italy.

History
A church at the site was present near Ponte Araldo over the Agogna river by the 12th century. It was rebuilt in 1500, and again as an ex-voto after the ebbing of the plague in 1630-1631. The present layout with a portico is owed to a 1680 reconstruction patronized by the Ramellini family.

References

Churches in Borgomanero
17th-century Roman Catholic church buildings in Italy
Roman Catholic churches completed in 1680